The Unnamable Present is a 2017 meditation by Roberto Calasso on the re-emergence of nationalism and totalitarianism in global politics and culture in the context of an artificially intelligent contemporary world-system. The ninth volume of Calasso's nameless cycle of reflections which began with the Ruin of Kasch, it is composed of two longer essays entitled "Tourists and Terrorists" and "The Vienna Gas Company" followed by a brief coda called "Sighting of the Towers."

Essays 
Tourists and Terrorists

Calasso discusses the feedback relationship between the rise of internet pornography and the rise of  Islamic terrorism in the 21st century: how the unmanageable and inexorable spread of pornography in culturally Muslim countries helped to fuel a radical (and ultimately violent) reaction against the West, how the consumerist model of "tourist" culture denudes the existential vapidity of the secular Enlightenment, and how all of these elements have contributed to a moment of cultural and geopolitical breakdown characterized by anomie, broken epistemology and existential threat by the time we arrive at the book's present in the immediate aftermath of the elections of a string of nationalist world-leaders including Donald Trump, Duterte, Orban, Bolsinaro and others.

When combined with the context of the book's second essay, Calasso's reflections on utilitarianism and the metaphysics of free-market economy in this chapter reveal  thematic and structural affinities to the Dialectic of the Enlightenment: the book comes to resemble an updated, condensed version of Adorno and Horkheimer's magnum opus laced with narratives, anecdotes and biographical sketches from the period in which that work was written.

The Vienna Gas Company 

The title of this essay recalls a line from a grim joke told by Walter Benjamin in one of his World War II letters which presaged the nature and methods used to kill concentration camp victims in the (still ongoing and yet to be fully scaled in terms of its execution) Holocaust. The essay is an impressionistic evocation of the rise of Adolf Hitler and the Third Reich, with special emphasis on the perspectives of a wide variety of European intellectuals observing these events as they unfolded.

References 

2017 non-fiction books
 
Cultural globalization